Quercus magnoliifolia, also known as encino amarillo, encino avellano, encino bermejo, encino blanco, encino napis, encino prieto, and roble, is a Mexican species of oak. It is widespread along the Pacific Coast of Mexico from Sinaloa to Chiapas, and also found inland as far as Zacatecas and Puebla.

It was classified and described in 1801 by the French-Spanish botanist Luis Née.

References

External links
photo of herbarium specimen at Missouri Botanical Garden collected in Nayarit in 1849

magnoliifolia
Plants described in 1801
Endemic oaks of Mexico